The Radio-Television News Directors Association of Canada or RTNDA Canada changed its name to Radio Television Digital News Association of Canada, or RTDNA Canada, in 2011. It is a Canadian membership organization of radio, television and online journalists, news directors, producers, executives and educators. It was founded in 1962, as the Canadian equivalent of the Radio Television Digital News Association in the United States. The RTNDA was founded to seek equal access to all types of news sources at a time when government agencies banned broadcast reporters from press conferences.

History
The Radio and Television News Directors Association of Canada (RTNDA) was founded in 1962, to seek equal access to all types of news sources at a time when government agencies banned broadcast reporters from press conferences. Broadcast News manager Charles Edwards was the driving force behind formation of the RTDNA. He had travelled across Canada to improve broadcast journalism, and instituted annual regional meetings to raise the standards for broadcast news directors.

The RTNDA Canada changed its name to Radio Television Digital News Association of Canada, or RTDNA Canada, in 2011.

The RTDNA code of ethics is the guideline by which the CBSC makes its rulings regarding complaints about radio and television broadcasts. RTDNA Canada has over 400 member stations.

Awards 
In 1967, the RTNDA renamed its annual award for spot news reporting to the Charlie Edwards Award, in recognition of Charles Edwards.

RTDNA has issues a Lifetime Achievement award since 2019, has been issuing local, regional, and national awards for outstanding journalism since 2021. It maintains a Hall of Fame list of individuals who have made an "outstanding contribution" to journalism.

See also
Canadian Broadcast Standards Council
Canadian Radio-television and Telecommunications Commission

References

External links
RTDNA Canada

1962 establishments in Canada
Radio organizations in Canada
Television organizations in Canada
Canadian journalism organizations
Organizations established in 1962